The Auxiliary Territorial Service (ATS; often pronounced as an acronym) was the women's branch of the British Army during the Second World War. It was formed on 9 September 1938, initially as a women's voluntary service, and existed until 1 February 1949, when it was merged into the Women's Royal Army Corps.

The ATS had its roots in the Women's Auxiliary Army Corps (WAAC), which was formed in 1917 as a voluntary service. During the First World War its members served in a number of jobs including clerks, cooks, telephonists and waitresses. The WAAC was disbanded after four years in 1921.

Prior to the Second World War, the government decided to establish a new Corps for women, and an advisory council, which included members of the Territorial Army (TA), a section of the Women's Transport Service (FANY) and the Women's Legion, was set up. The council decided that the ATS would be attached to the Territorial Army, and the women serving would receive two thirds the pay of male soldiers.

All women in the army joined the ATS except for nurses, who joined Queen Alexandra's Imperial Military Nursing Service (QAIMNS), medical and dental officers, who were commissioned directly into the Army and held army ranks, and those remaining in the FANY, known as Free FANYs.

In action

The first recruits to the ATS were employed as cooks, clerks and storekeepers. At the outbreak of the Second World War, 300 ATS members were billeted to France. As the German Army advanced through France, the British Expeditionary Force was driven back towards the English Channel. This led to the evacuation of troops from Dunkirk in May 1940, and some ATS telephonists were among the last British personnel to leave the country.

As more men joined the war effort, it was decided to increase the size of the ATS, with numbers reaching 65,000 by September 1941. Women between the ages of 17 and 43 were allowed to join, although these rules were relaxed in order to allow WAAC veterans to join up to the age of 50. The duties of members were also expanded, seeing ATS orderlies, drivers, postal workers and ammunition inspectors.

Over the six-year period of the War, about 500 ATS personnel were trained to operate the Cinetheodolite, with the highest number being in 1943–44, when 305 ATS were in active service using this equipment. 

One application of this specialist camera was in gunnery practice, where a pair of Cinetheodolites a known distance apart filmed the shell bursts from anti-aircraft artillery against target drones towed by an aircraft. By comparing the filmed location of the shells' detonation and the target, accurate calculations of their relative position could be made that would reveal any systematic error in the gunsights.

The National Service Act

In December 1941, Parliament passed the National Service Act, which called up unmarried women between 20 and 30 years old to join one of the auxiliary services. These were the ATS, the Women's Royal Naval Service (WRNS), the Women's Auxiliary Air Force (WAAF) and the Women's Transport Service. Married women were also later called up, although pregnant women and those with young children were exempt. Other options under the Act included joining the Women's Voluntary Service (WVS), which supplemented the emergency services at home, or the Women's Land Army, helping on farms.

There was also provision made in the act for objection to service on moral grounds, as about a third of those on the conscientious objectors list were women. A number of women were prosecuted as a result of the act, some even being imprisoned. Despite this, by 1943 about nine out of ten women were taking an active part in the war effort.

Women were barred from serving in battle, but due to shortages of men, ATS members, as well as members of the other women's voluntary services, took over many support tasks, such as radar operators, forming part of the crews of anti-aircraft guns and military police. However, these roles were not without risk, and there were, according to the Imperial War Museum, 717 casualties during World War II.

The first 'Mixed' Heavy Anti-Aircraft (HAA) battery of the Royal Artillery (435 (Mixed) HAA Battery) was formed on 25 June 1941, and took over an operational gun site in Richmond Park, south-west London, in August. It was the forerunner of hundreds of similar units with the ATS supplying two-thirds of the personnel: at its height in 1943 three-quarters of Anti-Aircraft Command's HAA batteries were mixed. Several Heavy Anti-Aircraft regiments deployed to North West Europe with 21st Army Group in 1944–45 were 'Mixed' regiments.

A secret trial (the 'Newark Experiment' in April 1941) having shown that women were capable of operating heavy searchlight equipment and coping with conditions on the often desolate searchlight sites, members of the ATS began training at Rhyl to replace male personnel in searchlight regiments. At first they were employed in searchlight Troop headquarters, but in July 1942 the 26th (London Electrical Engineers) Searchlight Regiment, Royal Artillery became the first 'Mixed' regiment, with seven Troops of ATS women posted to it, forming the whole of 301 Battery and half of 339 Battery. In October that year the all-women 301 Battery was transferred to the new 93rd (Mixed) Searchlight Regiment, the last searchlight regiment formed during World War II, which by August 1943 comprised about 1500 women out of an establishment of 1674. Many other searchlight and anti-aircraft regiments on Home Defence followed, freeing men aged under 30 of medical category A1 for transfer to the infantry.

Similarly, by 1943 the ATS represented 10 per cent of the Royal Corps of Signals, having taken over the major part of the signal office and operating duties in the War Office and Home Commands, and ATS companies were sent to work on the lines of communications of active overseas theatres.

By VE Day and before demobilization of the British armed forces, there were over 190,000 members of the women's Auxiliary Territorial Service.

Famous members of the ATS included Mary Churchill, youngest daughter of the prime minister, Winston Churchill, and Princess Elizabeth, later Queen Elizabeth II, eldest daughter of the King, who trained as a lorry driver, ambulance driver and mechanic.

Post-war
After the cessation of hostilities women continued to serve in the ATS, as well as in the WRNS and WAAF. It was succeeded by the Women's Royal Army Corps (WRAC), which formed on 1 February 1949 under Army Order 6.

Ranks
Initially ranks were completely different from those of the army, but used the same rank insignia, although the crown was replaced by a laurel wreath. Members were required to salute their own superior officers, but not other organisations' officers, although it was considered courteous to do so.

On 9 May 1941, the ATS rank structure was reorganised, and as of July 1941 the ATS was given full military status and members were no longer volunteers. The other ranks now held almost identical ranks to army personnel, but officers continued to have a separate rank system, that was somewhat modified. All uniforms and badges of rank remained the same, although crowns replaced laurel wreaths in the rank insignia. Members were now required to salute all superior officers.

The only holders of the rank of chief controller were the first three directors, promoted to the rank on their appointment, and Princess Mary, who held it from 1939 and was appointed the ATS's honorary controller-commandant in August 1941.

When other ranks were assigned to mixed-sex Royal Artillery batteries of Anti-Aircraft Command starting in 1941, they were accorded the Royal Artillery ranks of gunner, lance-bombardier, and bombardier (instead of private, lance-corporal, and corporal), and wore the RA's braided white lanyard on the right shoulder and the 'grenade' collar badge above the left breast pocket of their uniform tunic.

Officers

Other ranks

List of Directors ATS

 Chief Controller Dame Helen Gwynne-Vaughan, July 1939 – July 1941
 Chief Controller Jean Knox, July 1941 – October 1943
 Chief Controller Dame Leslie Whateley, October 1943 – April 1946
 Senior Controller Dame Mary Tyrwhitt, April 1946 – January 1949

Notable ATS personnel

 Julian Phelps Allan
 Betty Harvie Anderson, Baroness Skrimshire of Quarter
 Henrietta Barnett, later Director of the WRAF
 Violet Bathurst, Lady Apsley
 Joan Bernard
 Bridget Boland
 Nadia Cattouse
 Mary Spencer-Churchill (later Baroness Soames)
 Mary Colvin
 Margot Cooper
 Primrose Cumming
 Princess Elizabeth (later Queen Elizabeth II)
 Margaret Fairchild
 Pamela Frankau
 Christian Fraser-Tytler
 Edith Gell
 Gay Gibson
 Valerie Goulding
 Susan Hibbert
 Elisabeth Kirkby
 Esme Langley
 Linda McCullough Thew
 Bridget Monckton, 11th Lady Ruthven of Freeland
 Stella Moray
 Maisie Mosco
 Jennifer Moyle
 Eileen Nolan
 Julia Pirie
 Elisabeth Rivers-Bulkeley
 Yvonne Rudelatt
 Stella Schmolle
 Nancy Salmon
 Leslie Whateley
 Estelle White
 Celia Whitelaw, Viscountess Whitelaw

See also

Air Transport Auxiliary
National Association of Training Corps for Girls
Women's Auxiliary Air Force
Women's Royal Naval Service

Notes

References

Further reading
 Bidwell Shelford. Women's Royal Army Corps (1997) 141pp
 Bigland, Eileen. Britain's other army: The story of the A.T.S (1946), an official history
 Cowper, J. M. The Auxiliary Territorial Service (1949), an official history
 Crang, Jeremy A. "The revival of the British women's auxiliary services in the late nineteen-thirties," Historical Research (May 2010) Volume 83, Issue 220, pages 343–357, online at EBSCO
 Crang, Jeremy A. "'Come into the Army, Maud': Women, Military Conscription, and the Markham Inquiry," Defence Studies, Nov 2008, Vol. 8 Issue 3, pp 381–395, online at EBSCO
 Dady, Margaret. Women's War: Life in the Auxiliary Territorial Service (1986)
 De Groot, Gerard J. "'I love the scent of cordite in your hair': Gender dynamics in mixed anti-craft batteries" History, Jan 1997, Vol. 82 Issue 265, pp 73–92
 Kerr, Dorothy Brewer. Girls Behind the Guns: With the Auxiliary Territorial Service in World War II (1990)
 Noakes, Lucy. Women in the British Army: War and the Gentle Sex, 1907–48 (2006), pp 61–81 on ATS of war years
 Robinson, Vee. Sisters in Arms (1996)  A personal memoir by an ATS anti-aircraft gun crew member.

External links

 ATS/F.A.N.Y Uniforms
 ATS Remembered

British administrative corps
All-female military units and formations
British women in World War II
Military units and formations established in 1938
Military units and formations disestablished in 1949